Giovanni Fabrizio Sanseverino was a Roman Catholic prelate who served as Bishop of Trivento (1568–?)
and Bishop of Acerra (1560–1568).

Biography
On 13 March 1560, Giovanni Fabrizio Sanseverino was appointed during the papacy of Pope Pius IV as Bishop of Acerra.
In 1568, Giovanni Fabrizio Sanseverino was appointed during the papacy of Pope Pius V as Bishop of Trivento.
It is uncertain how long he served as Bishop of Trivento; the next bishop of record was Giulio Cesare Mariconda appointed in 1582.

References

External links and additional sources
 (for Chronology of Bishops) 
 (for Chronology of Bishops) 
 (for Chronology of Bishops) 
 (for Chronology of Bishops) 

16th-century Italian Roman Catholic bishops
Bishops appointed by Pope Pius IV
Bishops appointed by Pope Pius V